Cautious Hero: The Hero Is Overpowered but Overly Cautious is an anime television series adapted from the light novel series of the same title written by Light Tuchihi and illustrated by Saori Toyota. 

Announced on November 7, 2018, the series was produced by White Fox. It was directed by Masayuki Sakoi, with Kenta Ihara handling series composition, Mai Toda designing the characters, and Yoshiaki Fujisawa composing the music. It aired from October 2 to December 27, 2019 on AT-X and other channels. Myth & Roid performed the series' opening theme song "TIT FOR TAT", while Riko Azuna performed the series' ending theme song "be perfect, plz!". Funimation had licensed the series for a SimulDub. Following Sony's acquisition of Crunchyroll, the series was moved to Crunchyroll.

The third episode, which was supposed to air on October 16, 2019, was delayed by a week due to production issues, with a re-broadcast of Episode 2 taking its place. Similarly, Episode 10 was delayed for a week due to production issues, with a recap episode taking its place.

Episode list

Notes

References

External links
  
 

Cautious Hero